Andrzej Czarniak (11 November 1931 – 23 February 1985) was a Polish alpine skier. He competed in the men's downhill at the 1952 Winter Olympics. During his sports career, he represented the CWKS Zakopane club. At the Oslo Olympics, he competed in the downhill run, taking 42nd place.

References

1931 births
1985 deaths
Polish male alpine skiers
Olympic alpine skiers of Poland
Alpine skiers at the 1952 Winter Olympics
Sportspeople from Zakopane
20th-century Polish people